The 2006 Horizon League men's basketball tournament took place at the end of the 2005–06 regular season. The better seed hosted each first round match. Milwaukee hosted the second round and semifinals, because they were the top seed overall, as well as the final because they were the highest remaining seed.

Seeds
All Horizon League schools played in the tournament. Teams were seeded by 2005–06 Horizon League season record, with a tiebreaker system to seed teams with identical conference records. The top 2 teams received a bye to the semifinals and the third seed received a bye to the quarterfinals.

Bracket

First round games at campus sites of higher seeds
Second round and semifinals hosted by the top seed.
Championship hosted by best remaining seed

References

Tournament
Horizon League men's basketball tournament
Horizon League men's basketball tournament
Horizon League men's basketball tournament
Horizon League men's basketball tournament
Basketball competitions in Milwaukee